Kenny J. Williams (1927–2003) was an African American scholar and author, and an English professor at Duke University.

Williams was born in Kentucky, (hence the name "Kenny") and received her PhD from the University of Pennsylvania in 1959. She was from 1977 until her death, a professor in Duke University's Department of English. Her father was Joseph Harrison Jackson, President of the National Baptist Convention from 1941 to 1990.

In 1986, she received the MidAmerica Award from the Society for the Study of Midwestern Literature for distinguished contributions to the study of same. Williams was appointed in 1991 to the National Council on the Humanities by President George H. W. Bush.

She was member of the Executive Board of the American Literature Association, and also served on the Council of the National Endowment for the Humanities.

Published works

As author
 Chicago's Public Wits: A Chapter in the American Comic Spirit (1983 Louisiana State University Press) 
 A Storyteller and a City: Sherwood Anderson's Chicago(1988 Northern IL University Press) 
 Prairie voices: a literary history of Chicago from the frontier to 1893 (1980 Townsend Press),  
 They also spoke: an essay on Negro literature in America, 1787–1930 (1970 Townsend Press)

As illustrator
 Essays – Including Biographies and Miscellaneous Pieces, in Prose and Poetry, Ann Plato (author) (1988 Oxford University Press)

External links
 Campus article on Upstream
 Duke University: Duke News Briefs, January 9, 2004
 New Sense: A Publication of the Duke Conservative Union. In Memoriam: Kenny Williams (1927–2003), by Berin Szoka

20th-century American educators
African-American writers
American writers
Writers from Kentucky
Writers from North Carolina
Duke University faculty
Deaths from cancer
1927 births
2003 deaths
University of Pennsylvania alumni
20th-century African-American educators
21st-century African-American people